Idolagnostus is a genus of trilobite in the order Agnostida, which existed in what is now Queensland, Australia. It was described by Öpik in 1967, and the type species is Idolagnostus agrestis.

References

Agnostidae
Agnostida genera
Trilobites of Australia